London Buses route 98 is a Transport for London contracted bus route in London, England. Running between Willesden Bus Garage and Holborn, it is operated by Metroline.

History

Route 98 commenced on 18 July 1992 to replace route 8 between Willesden Garage and Oxford Circus, before continuing to Holborn. The route has always been operated by Metroline's Willesden Garage. It was initially operated by AEC Routemasters on Mondays to Saturdays in the daytime and Dennis Darts, MCW Metrobuses and Leyland Titans on Sundays and late evenings.

On 27 March 2004 routes 6 and 98 were converted to driver-only operation, with the AEC Routemasters replaced by Plaxton President bodied Volvo B7TLs.

In April 2016 the first five BYD double-decker electric buses in the world since trolleybuses started operating on the route as part of a pilot scheme. They are operated by Willesden Garage.

Current route
Route 98 operates via these primary locations:
Willesden Garage
Willesden Green station 
Kilburn High Road station 
Maida Vale station 
Edgware Road station 
Marble Arch station 
Great Titchfield Street / Oxford Circus station 
Tottenham Court Road station  
Holborn station  
Holborn Red Lion Square

References

External links

Timetable

Bus routes in London
Transport in the London Borough of Brent
Transport in the London Borough of Camden